Thibaut Capitaine (born 26 April 1993) is a French swimmer. He competed in the men's 50 metre breaststroke event at the 2018 FINA World Swimming Championships (25 m), in Hangzhou, China.

References

External links
 

1993 births
Living people
French male breaststroke swimmers
Place of birth missing (living people)